The 2021 Michelin Ginetta Junior Championship was a multi-event, one make motor racing championship held across England and Scotland. The championship featured a mix of professional teams and privately funded drivers, aged between 14 and 17, competing in Ginetta G40s that conformed to the technical regulations for the championship. It formed part of the extensive program of support categories built up around the British Touring Car Championship centrepiece. It was the fifteenth Ginetta Junior Championship, commencing on 8 May 2021 at Thruxton and concluding on 24 October 2021 at Brands Hatch, utilising the Grand Prix circuit, after ten meetings, all in support of the 2021 British Touring Car Championship. After a one year absence, Ginetta confirmed the Winter Series will return at the end of the year. A scholarship allowed a driver who had raced in go karts to start racing cars. The first round of the championship saw the record broken for most entries in a Ginetta Junior event. R Racing and Elite Motorsport are the most competitive teams, with Fox Motorsport also winning at Snetterton.

Teams and Drivers

Race Calendar 

Calendar Changes

The Ginetta Junior Championship will not support every round of the British Touring Car Championship in 2021. The series will miss the seventh round of the BTCC season at Croft.

Midseason Changes

Round 10 at Oulton Park was postponed due to barrier damage sustained during a Mini Challenge UK race. Due to timetable constraints the rescheduled race could not take place that weekend, so it was subsequently run at the following meeting at Knockhill.

Championship standings

Drivers' championship
A driver's best 19 scores counted towards the championship, with any other points being discarded.

External links 
 
 Ginetta Junior Championship News
 Ginetta Junior Update

References 

Ginetta Junior Championship season
Ginetta Junior Championship seasons